BU-48 is a drug that is used in scientific research. It is from the oripavine family, related to better-known drugs such as etorphine and buprenorphine. 

The parent compound from which BU-48 was derived (with N-methyl rather than methylcyclopropyl on the nitrogen and lacking the aliphatic hydroxyl group) is a powerful μ-opioid agonist 1000 times more potent than morphine, but in contrast BU-48 has only weak analgesic effects and instead acts primarily as a δ-opioid agonist. Its main effects are to produce convulsions, but it may also have antidepressant effects.

See also
 BU72
 BU08028

References 

Semisynthetic opioids
Delta-opioid receptor agonists
Phenols
4,5-Epoxymorphinans